Callback may refer to:

 Callback (comedy), a joke which refers to one previously told
 Callback (computer programming), executable code that is passed as a parameter to other code
 Callback (telecommunications), the telecommunications event that occurs when the originator of a call is immediately called back in a second call as a response
 Callback verification, a method for e-mail address verification used in SMTP
 Web callback, a technology that provides telephone callback for websites
 "The Callback", an episode of the TV series Smash
 Callback, in the performing arts, a stage of the audition process

See also 

 Caldbeck
 Callbeck
 Called Back (disambiguation)